The 1988 European Marathon Cup was the fourth edition of the quadrennial team marathon competition between European countries, which was held in Huy, Belgium on 30 April.

Results

Individual men

Individual women

References

Results
European Cup 1988. Association of Road Racing Statisticians. Retrieved 2018-04-15.

External links
 EAA web site

European Marathon Cup
European
Huy
International athletics competitions hosted by Belgium
European Marathon Cup
April 1988 sports events in Europe